Staff Sergeant Ysmael Reyes Villegas (March 21, 1924 – March 20, 1945), was a United States Army soldier who was posthumously awarded the Medal of Honor, the United States' highest military decoration, for heroism during World War II at the Battle of Luzon.

Background
Villegas, a Mexican-American, was born and raised in Casa Blanca, a predominantly Hispanic neighborhood of Riverside, California, where he received his primary and secondary education. Villegas was the oldest of 13 children born to Dario and Inez (Reyes) Villegas. Both of his parents were native to Mexico, his father from Michoacán and his mother was from Torreón. His official commendation states that Villegas was an “orange picker” prior to his enlistment. At the time, orange production was a major industry in the Riverside area.

Villegas joined the United States Army in July 1944. After he finished his basic training, he was assigned to Company F, 127th Infantry Regiment, 32nd Infantry Division which was assigned to the invasion of the Philippines.

Villegas, nicknamed “Smiley”, married Lillie Sanchez in 1944, a month before he was sent to war in the Pacific. Villegas never met their son who was born two weeks after Villegas was killed in action.

World War II
On March 1, 1945, Villegas' company found itself engaged in combat against Japanese forces at Villa Verde Trail on Luzon Island in the Philippines, in what is known as the Battle of Luzon. His squad was attacked by an enemy machinegun nest, and Villegas took it upon himself to save his squad by destroying the nest and its occupants. For his actions, Villegas was awarded the Silver Star medal.

On March 20, 1945, the day before his 21st birthday, Villegas was ordered to lead his squad in an advance which would result in the taking of a hill. They confronted an enemy which was entrenched and who attacked them with heavy machinegun and rifle fire. Villegas led his men toward the crest of the hill and then upon his own initiative attacked five enemy foxholes, killing all of their occupants. He was mortally wounded when he attacked the sixth foxhole. His bravery inspired his troupes to take the rest of the hill.

Medal of Honor
On October 19, 1945, President Harry S. Truman posthumously awarded the Medal of Honor to Villegas. The medal was presented to his widow by Col. G. B. Appleman on November 1, 1945, at Camp Haan in Riverside, California. An estimated 2,000 people attended the ceremony.

Military Awards and decorations
Among Staff Sergeant Ysmael R. Villegas' decorations and medals were the following:

In Memoriam
Initially, Villegas was buried at Riverside's Olivewood Cemetery in 1949. His remains were reinterred to become the first veteran buried at the Riverside National Cemetery when that cemetery opened on November 11, 1978.

Villegas was the first Riverside County resident to receive the Medal of Honor. The city of Riverside has recognized his heroism in a number of ways.
 In 1952, the city formally named a park located in the Casa Blanca neighborhood Ysmael Villegas Park.
 The Veterans of Foreign Wars (VFW) named Post #184 in Riverside the “Ysmael R. Villegas Memorial Casa Blanca Post” in his honor. 
 A statue by sculptor Gary E. Coulter, called Villegas Memorial, was dedicated on May 27, 1995, and is located on Main Street Civic Center Courtyard in Riverside. 
 Ysmael R. Villegas Middle School in Riverside is named in his honor.

See also

 List of Medal of Honor recipients for World War II
 Hispanic Medal of Honor recipients
 Hispanic Americans in World War II
 David M. Gonzales, also a 32d Infantry Division Medal of Honor recipient
 Salvador J. Lara, also a World War II Medal of Honor recipient from Riverside
 Jesus S. Duran, a Vietnam War Medal of Honor recipient from Riverside

References

Further reading

External links
 
 
 
 Ysmael R Villegas, Billion Graves

United States Army Medal of Honor recipients
World War II recipients of the Medal of Honor
Recipients of the Silver Star
United States Army non-commissioned officers
American people of Mexican descent
United States Army personnel killed in World War II
Burials at Riverside National Cemetery
People from Riverside, California
1924 births
1945 deaths